Mary Melfi (born 1 July 1951) is a Canadian writer of Italian descent. She is a prolific poet, novelist, and playwright.

Biography
Melfi was born in Casacalenda, a small mountain town in the province of Campobasso, (Molise), south of Rome in 1951. At the age of six, she immigrated with her family to Montreal, Quebec where she attended the local English schools. She received a B.A. in English Literature from Concordia University and a Masters of Library Science from McGill University. Since completing her studies in 1977 she has published over a dozen books of critically acclaimed poetry and prose. Her first novel, Infertility Rites, was published by Guernica Editions in 1991; it was later translated into French and Italian. In 1994 Doubleday Canada published her children's fantasy book: Ubu, the Witch Who Would be Rich. Also a playwright, Mary Melfi's works for the theater have been workshopped in Montreal, Toronto and Vancouver. Noted for her black humour, wry wit and imaginative style critics have suggested that this author manages "not only to make us laugh, but also think." The Concise Oxford Companion to Canadian Literature observes that "her writings are characterized by an avant-garde sensibility that transgresses the conventions of a given literary form (whether it is poetry, drama or fiction)…. Melfi is interested in the metaphysical side of human existence, the difficulties of establishing a coherent feminine identity, cultural dislocation, and the artist’s attempt to create a new reality." In-depth reviews of her writings can be found in William Anselmi's book: Mary Melfi, Essays on her Work (Guernica Editions, 2007). Melfi's account of peasant life in Southern Italy during the 1930s entitled Italy Revisited: Conversations with my Mother was published in 2009 by Guernica Editions.  To complement the book, Melfi has created a website in which she has compiled thousands of photos of peasant life in turn of the century Italy.

Mary Melfi presently lives in Montreal. She lived with her husband until his death in 2009.

Works

Nonfiction 
Painting Moments: Art, AIDS and Nick Palazzo. [Editor]. Guernica Editions, 1998
Italy Revisited: Conversations with my Mother. Guernica Editions, 2009
In the Backyard: Relearning the Art of Aging, Dying and Making Love. Guernica Editions, 2018.

Adult Fiction 
A Dialogue with Masks. Mosaic Press, 1985.
Infertility Rites. Guernica Editions, 1991.
Via Roma. Guernica Editions, 2015.

Children’s Fiction 
Ubu, the Witch Who Would be Rich. Doubleday Canada, 1994.

Plays 
Sex Therapy, A Black Comedy: A Play in 13 scenes. Guernica Editions, 1996.
Foreplay and My Italian Wife: Two Plays. Guernica Editions, 2012.

Poetry 
The Dance, The Cage and The Horse. D Press, 1976.
A Queen Is Holding a Mummified Cat. Guernica Editions, 1982.
A Bride in Three Acts. Guernica Editions, 1983.
The O Canada Poems. Brandon University, 1986.
A Season in Beware. Black Moss Press, 1989.
Stages: Selected Poems. Guernica Editions, 1998.
Office Politics. Guernica Editions, 1999.
Welcome to Hard Times. Ekstasis Press, 2023

Books in Translation (French) 
Les Rites de l’Infertilite [translated by Jocelyne Doray]. Balzac-Le Griot, 1999.
Là-bas, en Italie  [translated by Claude Bèland].  Les Editions Triptyque, 2015.
Via Roma [translated by Claude Bèland]. Les Editions Triptyque, 2018.

Books in Translation (Italian)   
Riti di Infertilita  [translated by Silvana Mangione]. Iannone Editions, 2002.
Ritorno in Italia [translated by Laura Ferri]. Iannone Editions, 2012.

Critical Appraisals (Published) 
Mary Melfi, Essays on her Works, edited by William Anselmi, Guernica Editions, 2007.     
Italian-Canadian Narratives of Return, Analysing Cultural Translation in Diasporic Writing, by Michaela Balda, Palgrave, Macmillan, 2019.

PhDs and MA Theses on Melfi’s Work 
Licia Canton, “Six Italian-Canadian Novelists: Mary Melfi, Antonio D'Alfonso, Marisa De Francchi, F.G. Paci, Catherina Edwards.” University of Montreal, 1997
Maria Dell’ Anna, “I due mondi di Mary Melfi,” University of Lecce, Italy, 1998-1999.
Lise Hogan, “Poetics as Displaced Praxis: Perspectives of Irony in the Poetry of Mary Melfi.” University of Alberta, 2004.
Nadia Santoro, “Narrzioni migranti di (dis)appartenenza. ” University of Calabria, 2014.
Tiziana Nannavecchia, “Translating Italian-Canadian Migrant Writing to Italian:  a Discourse Around the Return to the Motherland/Tongue,” University of Ottawa, 2016.

Interviews (Abridged) 
Accenti. April 2020, interviewed by Liana Cusmano
Italian Canadiana. 2019, Vol. 33, interviewed by John Lewis.
Panaram Italia, Liz Allemang, Panoram Italia June/July 2015

References

External links 
Italy Revisited

1951 births
Living people
Canadian women dramatists and playwrights
Canadian women novelists
Canadian women poets
Concordia University alumni
Canadian people of Italian descent
McGill University School of Information Studies alumni
20th-century Canadian novelists
21st-century Canadian novelists
20th-century Canadian poets
21st-century Canadian poets
20th-century Canadian dramatists and playwrights
21st-century Canadian dramatists and playwrights
20th-century Canadian women writers
21st-century Canadian women writers